Calichín is a 2016 Peruvian sports comedy film directed by Ricardo Maldonado and written by César de María. It is starring Aldo Miyashiro. It premiered on November 10, 2016 in Peruvian theaters. It can be seen on the Prime Video platform.

Synopsis 
Calichín Delgado (Miyashiro), a renowned soccer player returns to his country from Europe but in steep decline. His goal is to recover his former glory in a second division club in the Peruvian highlands and also his little daughter.

Cast 
The cast is composed of:

 Aldo Miyashiro
 Miguel Iza
 André Silva
 William Castaneda

 Irma Maury
 Ubaldo Huamán ("El cholo Cirilo")
 Zoe Arevalo
 Juliana Molina
 Tulio Loza
 Andy Merino "Andynsane"
 Gerardo Vasquez "Gerardo Pe'"
 Erick Osores (as guest)
 Natalie Vértiz (as guest)

Production 
The film was produced by Cine 70, production company Maldonado, director of the film. It was written by Cesar de Maria. Filmed in various locations, such as Lima, Canta, Lachaqui and Obrajillo, it was released on November 10, 2016. It also had the participation of the Peruvian youtubers: Mox (José Romero), Andynsane (Andy Merino) and Gerardo Pe' (Gerardo Vásquez).

References

External links 

 
2016 films
2016 comedy films
2010s sports comedy films
Peruvian sports comedy films
2010s Peruvian films
2010s Spanish-language films

Films set in Peru
Films shot in Peru
Films about sportspeople
Films about father–daughter relationships